Niko Medved (born August 10, 1973) is an American college basketball coach, currently the head men's basketball coach at Colorado State University. Prior to becoming head coach at Colorado State, he was head coach at Drake University and Furman.

Early life and education
Born in Minneapolis, Medved graduated from Roseville Area High School in nearby Roseville, Minnesota in 1992. In high school, Medved was a letterwinner in basketball and golf.

Assistant coach
Medved was an assistant coach at Furman from 1999 to 2006. He spent a year as assistant at his alma mater, Minnesota, under Dan Monson (who resigned mid-season) and Jim Molinari.

Medved then enjoyed success as an assistant coach at Colorado State under Tim Miles. He helped guide the Rams to four straight postseason appearances, including back-to-back trips to the 2012 and 2013 NCAA tournament. He helped Colorado State achieve records of 19–13 and 20–12.

Furman
On April 12, 2013 that Medved was announced as the head coach for Furman University for the 2013–14 season. Medved took over a struggling Furman program, taking over a seven-win team in 2013 and progressing to nine, 11, 19, and 23 wins in successive seasons. Medved has also coached back-to-back Southern Conference Players of the Year in Stephen Croone and Devin Sibley, Jr. In his third season at Furman in 2015–16, the Paladins finished with a 19–16 overall record, a third-place finish in the Southern Conference, and the school's first postseason victory in 40 years. He led the Paladins to the second round of the CollegeInsider.com Tournament (CIT).

In January 2017, Medved signed a contract extension with Furman through 2022.

In 2017, Medved was named SoCon Coach of the Year as he led the Paladins to the SoCon regular-season championship with a 13–3 conference record. Losing in the SoCon tournament led to another appearance in the CIT.

Drake
On March 26, 2017, Medved was hired as head coach at Drake.  After a 17-17 season with an inherited senior laden team, his controversial departure less than a calendar year later left Drake with five players and no coaching staff.

Return to Colorado State
After one season at Drake, Medved was named head coach of Colorado State on March 22, 2018.  He named Dave Thorson, JR Blount and Ali Farokhmanesh as his assistants.

In 2022, Medved led the Rams to their first NCAA tournament appearance since 2013.

Head coaching record

Notes

References

1973 births
Living people
American men's basketball coaches
Basketball coaches from Minnesota
College men's basketball head coaches in the United States
Colorado State Rams men's basketball coaches
Drake Bulldogs men's basketball coaches
Furman Paladins men's basketball coaches
Macalester Scots men's basketball coaches
Minnesota Golden Gophers men's basketball coaches
Sports coaches from Minneapolis
University of Minnesota alumni
People from Roseville, Minnesota
Roseville Area High School alumni